Flag of King Sisingamangaraja is the standard or banner used by the Sisingamangaraja dynasty during their long reign over Bakkara and over the territories around Lake Toba. The flag can be found in places such as: The Tomb of Sisingamangaraja in Balige and also in the Sisingamangaraja Memorial in Tarutung, however the flags in these places are mere replicas, as the real flag was taken by Hans Cristoffel, a Dutch captain sent to kill Sisingamangaraja XII. Today the real flag can be found in the Aan de Stroom Museum, Belgium.

Symbolism 
The banner holds many philosophical meanings, being:

 The colour white represents Partondi Hamuliaon or purity.
 The colour red represents Banua Tonga or the living world.
 The double-edged sword or Piso Gaja Dompak represents truth and fairness.
 The eight-pointed star or Mataniari Sidompahon represents the eight directions meaning support from all sides.
 The white circle or Bulan na Gok represents the descendants of Guru Tatea Bulan

Contemporary Uses 
Today, the usage of the standard can be seen in governmental buildings in North Sumatra. The standard has also been adopted to be the symbol of a few educational institutions such as the University of Sisingamangaraja XII Medan, University of Sisingamangaraja XII Tapanuli and STMIK Sisingamangaraja XII.

References 

Flags of Indonesia